Charles Goodell (May 11, 1853 – October 13, 1940) was an American farmer and politician from New York.

Life 
Goodell was born on May 11, 1853 in Decatur, New York. Once he reached his majority, he was elected Town Clerk. He then served as town supervisor in 1879, 1880, and 1881. In 1885, he moved to Worcester, where he was appointed, and then elected, justice of the peace. He was a farmer and a dealer in hops, butter, and other farm produce.

In 1891, he was elected to the New York State Assembly as a Democrat, representing the Otsego County 1st District. He served in the Assembly in 1892.

Goodell was a member of the Methodist church. He was a freemason and a member of The Elks and the Woodmen of the World.

In 1935, Goodell moved to West Palm Beach, Florida. He died there on October 13, 1940. He was buried in Maple Grove Cemetery in Worcester.

References

External links 
The Political Graveyard
Charles Goodell at Find a Grave

1853 births
1940 deaths
People from Worcester, New York
Town supervisors in New York (state)
American justices of the peace
Farmers from New York (state)
19th-century American politicians
Democratic Party members of the New York State Assembly
Methodists from New York (state)
American Freemasons
Burials in New York (state)